Pietro Paolo Agabito or Agabiti (c1470-c1540) was an Italian Renaissance painter, sculptor, and architect from the Marche region.  His style is rather provincial, and most surviving works are in the churches and museums of the region.  He may have trained with Carlo Crivelli, and among the artists generally credited with having influenced his style are the Venetians Cima da Conegliano and Alvise Vivarini, the Bolognese artist Francesco Francia and Marco Palmezzano of Forlì. However, Agabiti did not keep up with the changes of style occurring in the early sixteenth century, remaining attached to the more formal style of the fifteenth century.

Biography
He was born at Sassoferrato. He probably started by working in the ceramics factory of his father. He may well have travelled to Venice in 1497 because his first known work, of the Enthroned Virgin between Saints Peter and Sebastian, shows clear Venetian influence. It can now be found in the Museo Civico in Padua.

He may also have become a pupil of Carlo Crivelli, a well-known Venetian artist who moved to and spent much of his career in the Marche. Agabiti had returned to the Marche by 1502 and in 1507 was resident in Jesi. He is documented in his native town of Sassoferrato from 1510 onwards, producing altarpieces for local churches. Several can still be found in the churches for which they were painted but others are now in the Museo Civico in Sassoferrato, in the Pinacoteca Civica in Jesi or in private collections. He has always been seen as a minor, regional artist and few of his works are to be found in foreign collections. Exceptions include a Nativity now in the Christian Museum (Hungary) in Esztergom. The Italian Wikipedia entry for Agabiti contains a list of 19 extant paintings by him, giving their present whereabouts, although this is acknowledged to be an incomplete list.

In 1531, he retired to the Convento dell’Eremita, Cupramontana, another town in the Marche region, where he died approximately nine years later.

References

Dizionario Biografico dei Marchigiani - Edizione Il Lavoro editoriale Ancona - Terza Edizione in DVD - 2007 porno hubu
Gennaro Toscano. "Agabiti, Pietro Paolo." Grove Art Online. Oxford Art Online. 9 Oct. 2010 

People from the Province of Ancona
15th-century Italian painters
Italian male painters
16th-century Italian painters
Italian Renaissance painters
16th-century Italian architects
15th-century Italian sculptors
Italian male sculptors
16th-century Italian sculptors
1470 births